Iain Wainwright (born 27 January 1949) is a South African cricketer. He played in three first-class matches for Border from 1972/73 to 1976/77.

See also
 List of Border representative cricketers

References

External links
 

1949 births
Living people
South African cricketers
Border cricketers